A diverging diamond interchange (DDI), also called a double crossover diamond interchange (DCD), is a subset of diamond interchange in which the opposing directions of travel on the non-freeway road cross each other on either side of the interchange so that traffic crossing the freeway on the overpass or underpass is operating on the opposite driving side from that which is customary for the jurisdiction. The crossovers may employ one-side overpasses or be at-grade and controlled by traffic light.

The diverging diamond interchange has advantages in both efficiency and safety, and—despite having been in use in France since the 1970s—was cited by Popular Science as one of the best engineering innovations of 2009 and in the U.S. has been promoted as part of the Federal Highway Administration's Every Day Counts initiative. The flow through a diverging diamond interchange using overpasses at the crossovers is limited only by weaving, and the flow through an implementation using traffic lights is subject to only two clearance intervals (the time during which all lights are red so that the intersection may fully clear) per cycle.

The greatest safety concern of the interchange stems from its relative rarity, as drivers instinctively trying to stay on the customary side of the road could use the crossover intersections to turn against the posted direction of travel. This is a rare occurrence; it is possible only when traffic is so sparse that no cars from the oncoming direction are stopped at the light, and clear signage further reduces the likelihood of such errors.

History 

The first known diverging diamond interchanges were in France in the communities of Versailles (A13 at D182), Le Perreux-sur-Marne (A4 at N486) and Seclin (A1 at D549), all built in the 1970s. The ramps of the first two have since been reconfigured to accommodate ramps of other interchanges, but they continue to function as diverging diamond interchanges. The interchange in Seclin (at ) between the A1 and Route d'Avelin was somewhat more specialized than in the diagram at right: eastbound traffic on Route d'Avelin intending to enter the A1 northbound must keep left and cross the northernmost bridge before turning left to proceed north onto A1; eastbound traffic continuing east on Route d'Avelin must select a single center lane, merge with A1 traffic that is exiting to proceed east, and cross a center bridge. All westbound traffic that is continuing west or turning south onto A1 uses the southernmost bridge.

In the United States in 2005, the Ohio Department of Transportation (ODOT) considered reconfiguring the existing interchange on Interstate 75 at U.S. Route 224 and State Route 15 west of Findlay as a diverging diamond interchange to improve traffic flow. Had it been constructed, it would have been the first DDI in the United States. By 2006, ODOT had reconsidered, instead adding lanes to the existing overpass.

The Missouri Department of Transportation was the first US agency to construct one, in Springfield at the junction between I-44 and Missouri Route 13 (at ). Construction began the week of January 12, 2009, and the interchange opened on June 21, 2009. This interchange was a conversion of an existing standard diamond interchange, and used the existing bridge.

In 2010, the Federal Highway Administration released a publication titled "Alternative Intersections/Interchanges: Informational Report (AIIR)" with a chapter dedicated to this design. Additional research was conducted by a partnership of the Virginia Polytechnic Institute and State University and the Turner-Fairbank Highway Research Center and published by Ohio Section of the Institute of Transportation Engineers.

On August 14, 2011, the Kentucky Transportation Cabinet (KYTC) completed conversion of the intersection of U.S. Route 68 and Kentucky Route 4 in Lexington to a diverging diamond design, the first in the state and the sixth completed nationally. Stantec, the engineers who completed the upgrades to the interchange, noted the solution while providing substantial cost savings over other possible options also has decreased accidents by 45 percent, improved traffic flow to more than 35,000 vehicles per day, and incorporated KYTC's goal to provide new paths for bicycles and pedestrians through the area. That same day in Highland, Utah the seventh U.S. diverging diamond interchange opened at the intersection of I-15 and Timpanogos Highway. According to the U.S. Department of Transportation the goals of this intersection upgrade were similar, increasing traffic capacity and improved pedestrian and bicycle access while reaching these goals without requiring substantial revisions to the existing interstate overpass. Quoting a June 2014 USDOT publication, "...the DDI has made travel more efficient and accessible for all users."

2016 saw the introduction of diverging diamond interchages to three states. In February, the Oregon Department of Transportation opened one in Phoenix. In October, the New Mexico Department of Transportation converted the crossing of NM 14 (Cerrillos Road) and Interstate 25 in Santa Fe. In November, the Delaware Department of Transportation completed the conversion of the DE-1 and DE-72 (Wrangle Hill Rd) overpass west of Delaware City.

The first interchange in Canada opened on August 13, 2017, at Macleod Trail and 162 Avenue South in Calgary, Alberta followed by one in Regina, Saskatchewan the next year as part of the Regina Bypass project.

The first diverging diamond interchange in Australia opened to traffic by the Queensland Department of Transport and Main Roads on November 28, 2019. The interchange, located in Caloundra, Queensland, connects Caloundra Road to the Bruce Highway. The former interchange was upgraded and converted as part of the larger Bruce Highway Upgrade Program.

In December 2019, the Virginia Department of Transportation completed the conversion of the interchange at Courthouse Road and I-95 in Stafford, VA into a diverging diamond interchange.

In 2020, the California Department of Transportation (Caltrans) completed the first diverging diamond interchange in California. An interchange at State Route 120 and Union Road in Manteca, California was converted to this interchange and opened to traffic on November 25.

Use

Operational 
, over 160 DDIs were operational across the world including:

 3 in Australia with more planned
 1 in Belgium
 3 in Canada
 1 in Denmark opened September 17, 2017
 2 in France, built in 1970s
 1 in Malaysia 
 2 in Saudi Arabia
 2 in South Africa
 1 in the United Arab Emirates
 1 in Costa Rica
 Over 150 in the United States of America with 80 more under construction

Advantages 

 Two-phase signals with short cycle lengths, significantly reducing delay.
 Reduced horizontal curvature reduces the risk of off-road crashes.
 Increases the capacity of turning movements to and from the ramps.
 Potentially reduces the number of lanes on the crossroad, minimizing space consumption.
 Reduces the number of conflict points, thus theoretically improving safety.
 Increases the capacity of an existing overpass or underpass, by removing the need for turn lanes.
 Costs significantly less than a normal interchange.

Disadvantages 

 Drivers may not be familiar with configuration, particularly with regard to merging maneuvers along the opposite side of the roadway or the crossover flow of traffic.
 Pedestrian (and other sidewalk-user) access requires at least four crosswalks (two to cross the two signalized lane crossover intersections, while two more cross the local road at each end of the interchange). This could be mitigated by signalizing all movements, without impacting the two-phase nature of the interchange’s signals.  
 Free-flowing traffic in both directions on the non-freeway road is impossible, as the signals cannot be green at both intersections for both directions simultaneously.
 Highway bus stops must be sited outside the interchange.
 Allowing exiting traffic to re-enter the through road in the same direction requires leaving the interchange on the local road and turning around, e.g., via a median U-turn crossover. This affects several use cases:
 Drivers who take the wrong exit
 Bypassing a crash at the bridge
 Allowing an oversize load to bypass a low bridge

Further considerations 
 No standards currently exist for this design.
 The design depends on site-specific conditions.
 Additional signage, lighting, and pavement markings are needed beyond the levels for a standard diamond interchange.
 Local road should be a low-speed facility, preferably under  posted speed on the crossroad approach. However, this may be mitigated by utilizing a higher design speed for the crossing movements.

Double crossover merging interchange 

A free-flowing interchange variant, patented in 2015, has received recent attention. Called the double crossover merging interchange (DCMI), it includes elements from the diverging diamond interchange, the tight diamond interchange, and the stack interchange. It eliminates the disadvantages of weaving and of merging into the outside lane from which the standard DDI variation suffers. A highway U-turn requires weaving, however. As of 2016, no such interchanges have been constructed.

See also 
List of road interchanges in the United States
 Single-point urban interchange (SPUI)
 Jughandle
 Hook turn
 Michigan left
 Superstreet

References

Further reading

External links 

 DDI Guideline – A UDOT Guide to Diverging Diamond Interchanges, Utah Department of Transportation, June 2014
 Transportation engineers discuss the design of the fifth U.S. DDI in Alcoa, TN
 Video of Paramics Traffic Simualtion software modeling a Double Crossover Diamond Interchange
 Diverging Diamond Interchange Visualization, Instructional video on how to drive in a DDI, NCDOTcommunications, published on 10 March 2011
 Images of Diverging Diamond Interchange in Springfield, Missouri the first in North America.
 Animation of Diverging Diamond Interchange under construction at Elmhurst Road on Interstate 90 near Elk Grove, Illinois, to be completed in 2016
 Animation of Diverging Diamond Interchange at I-590/Winton Road (Rochester, New York)

Examples 

  Diverging diamond in Versailles, France
  Diverging diamond in Seclin, France
  Diverging diamond in Springfield, Missouri

Road junction types

de:Anschlussstelle (Autobahn)#DDI / DCD